The Foam Stakes was an American Thoroughbred horse race run annually from 1880 through 1910 at Sheepshead Bay Race Track in Sheepshead Bay, Brooklyn, New York. An event for two-year-old horses of either sex, the race was run on dirt over a distance of five furlongs with the exception of 1896 when it was for three-year-old fillies at one mile (8 furlongs). The inaugural running took place on June 19, 1880 and was won by Spinaway for whom the prestigious Grade 1 Spinaway Stakes at Saratoga Race Course was named. The final running took place on June 21, 1910 and was won by Royal Meteor for the Newcastle Stable racing partnership headed by Life magazine publisher Andrew Miller. The Foam was the only stakes race on the card.

The end of a race and of a racetrack
On June 11, 1908, the Republican controlled New York Legislature under Governor Charles Evans Hughes passed the Hart–Agnew anti-betting legislation. The owners of Sheepshead Bay Race Track, and other racing facilities in New York State, struggled to stay in business without income from betting. Racetrack operators had no choice but to drastically reduce the purse money being paid out which resulted in the Foam Stakes offering a purse in 1909 that was less than one-eight of what it had been in earlier years. These small purses made horse racing unprofitable and impossible for even the most successful horse owners to continue in business. As such, for the 1910 racing season management of the Sheepshead Bay facility dropped some of its minor stakes races and used the purse money to bolster more important events.

In spite of strong opposition by prominent owners such as August Belmont, Jr. and Harry Payne Whitney, reform legislators were not happy when they learned that betting was still going on at racetracks between individuals and they had further restrictive legislation passed by the New York Legislature in 1910. Recorded as the Executive Liability Act, the legislation made it possible for racetrack owners and members of its board of directors to be fined and imprisoned if anyone was found betting, even privately, anywhere on their premises. After a 1911 amendment to the law to limit the liability of owners and directors was defeated, every racetrack in New York State shut down. As a result, the Foam Stakes was not run in 1911 and 1912.

Owners, whose horses of racing age had nowhere to go, began sending them, their trainers and their jockeys to race in England and France. Many horses ended their racing careers there and a number remained to become an important part of the European horse breeding industry. Thoroughbred Times reported that  more than 1,500 American horses were sent overseas between 1908 and 1913 and of them at least 24 were either past, present, or future Champions. When a February 21, 1913 ruling by the New York Supreme Court, Appellate Division Court saw horse racing return in 1913 it was too late for the Sheepshead Bay horse racing facility and it never reopened.

Records
Speed record:
 0:59.40 @ 5 furlongs : Flyback (1904)

Most wins by a jockey:
 3 – Edward Garrison (1887, 1889, 1892)

Most wins by a trainer:
 3 – R. Wyndham Walden (1880, 1887, 1890)

Most wins by an owner:
 2 – William Lawrence Scott (1884, 1885)
 2 – Pierre Lorillard IV (1881, 1882)
 2 – Dwyer Brothers Stable (1883, 1886)

Winners

References

Flat horse races for two-year-olds
Discontinued horse races in New York City
Sheepshead Bay Race Track
Recurring sporting events established in 1880
Recurring sporting events disestablished in 1910
1880 establishments in New York (state)
1910 disestablishments in New York (state)